Upper Annandale Football Club are a football club from the town of Moffat in the Dumfries and Galloway area of Scotland. The club was founded in 1966 and plays in the South of Scotland Football League.  

They originally competed in the Dumfries & District Amateur Football League, but switched to the senior leagues in time for the 2014–15 season. Home matches are played at Moffat Academy which accommodates approximately 1,000 spectators. The club are managed by Darren Ferbie. 

Uppers won the Dumfries & District AFL Division One title a total of five times, including four successive title between 2007 and 2010. Since their move to the South of Scotland League, their best league finish has been 5th position in 2018–19.

Honours

Dumfries & District AFL Division One
Winners (5): 1970–71, 2006–07, 2007–08, 2008–09, 2009–10

External links 
 Official Twitter

Football clubs in Dumfries and Galloway
South of Scotland Football League teams
Football clubs in Scotland
Association football clubs established in 1966
1966 establishments in Scotland
Moffat